Costești is a commune in Vaslui County, Western Moldavia, Romania. It is composed of six villages: Chițcani, Costești, Dinga, Pârvești, Puntișeni and Rădești.

On 20 March 2010, Realitatea TV, together with Petrom, MaiMultVerde, Romsilva and the Vaslui County Council, planted 25,000 saplings on an area of 5 hectares in Chițcani.

Natives
 Ioan Hristea

References

Communes in Vaslui County
Localities in Western Moldavia